Serixia annulata is a species of beetle in the family Cerambycidae. It was described by Stephan von Breuning in 1958. It originates from Borneo.

References

Serixia
Beetles described in 1958